Nankana Sahib-Sangla Hill Road (Punjabi), also known locally as Shahkot Sangla Road is a provincially maintained road in Punjab that extends from Nankana Sahib to Sangla Hill.

Road is under-construction from Shahkot to Sangla Hill.

Salient features
Length: 47 km

Lanes: 2 lanes (Nankana to Shahkot) & 4 lanes (Shahot to Sangla Hill)

Speed limit: Universal minimum speed limit of 60 km/h and a maximum speed limit of 80 km/h for heavy transport vehicles and 100 km/h for light transport vehicles.

References

Roads in Punjab, Pakistan
Nankana Sahib District